Bass Lake is a census-designated place (CDP) in Geauga County, Ohio, United States, corresponding to the unincorporated community of West Bass Lake. The area was first listed as a CDP prior to the 2020 census.

The CDP is in the northwest part of Geauga County, in northeastern Munson Township. It is on the northwest side of Bass Lake, a natural lake on the Chagrin River, and extends up the valley side to the northwest as far as Wilson Mills Road at the top of the hill.

Demographics

References 

Census-designated places in Geauga County, Ohio
Census-designated places in Ohio